Move On may refer to:

Songs

 "Move On" (ABBA song)
 "Move On" (4th Avenue Jones song)
 "Move On" (David Bowie song)
 "Move On" (Jonas Brothers song)
 "Move On" (David Jordan song)
 "Move On" (Modern Romance song)
 "Move On" (No Doubt song)
 "Move On" (Rain song)
 "Move On" (The Warren Brothers song)
 "(So Tired of Standing Still We Got to) Move On", 1991 song by James Brown
 "Move On", a song by Jet from the 2003 album Get Born
 "Move On", a song by ATB from the album Distant Earth
 "Move On", a song by Stephen Sondheim from the 1984 musical Sunday in the Park with George
 "Move On", a song by Slaughterhouse
 "Move On", a song by Korn from the album Korn III: Remember Who You Are
 "Move On", a song by Clare Dunn
 "Move On", a song by Paul Stanley from his first solo album, Paul Stanley
 "Move On", a song by Mike Posner from his 2019 album A Real Good Kid

Television episodes

 "Move On" (Desperate Housewives)

Film

 Move On (1903 film), a 1903 short film directed by Alfred C. Abadie
 Move On (1917 film), a 1917 short comedy film directed by Billy Gilbert and Gilbert Pratt
 Move On (2012 film), a 2012 film directed by Asger Leth

Organizations

 MoveOn.org